is a Japanese footballer who plays for FC Ryukyu.

Career statistics
Updated to 2 January 2020.

References

External links

Profile at FC Gifu
Profile at Shimizu S-Pulse

1991 births
Living people
Association football people from Osaka Prefecture
Japanese footballers
J1 League players
J2 League players
J3 League players
Kyoto Sanga FC players
People from Hirakata
Shimizu S-Pulse players
FC Gifu players
Gainare Tottori players
Tokyo Verdy players
FC Ryukyu players
Association football defenders